Cadent Gas  is a British regional gas distribution company that owns, operates and maintains the largest natural gas distribution network in the United Kingdom, transporting gas to 11 million homes and businesses across North West England, West Midlands, East Midlands, East of England and North London.

Cadent Gas Limited represents four of the eight gas distribution networks in the United Kingdom. Following production and importation, all gas in the UK passes through National Grid's national transmission system, before entering the distribution networks. The distribution network providers, one of which is Cadent Limited, are responsible for the safe and efficient transportation of the gas to the end consumer, on behalf of the chosen supplier.

The company does not produce or own the gas that passes through their pipeline networks but 50% of UK gas customers are served by their pipeline system.

The company also manages the national gas emergency service free phone line on behalf of the gas industry in the UK, taking calls and giving safety advice on behalf of the industry. In 2017/18 1.952 million gas emergency calls were answered.

The company invests in raising awareness of the dangers of carbon monoxide poisoning through community and school initiatives as well as improving services to protect and support customers in vulnerable situations.

In 2017, the company launched a two-year fundraising partnership with Alzheimer's Society and committed to creating 1,000 Dementia Friends and also raising £100,000 company-wide for the charity. Cadent Gas Limited also sponsor ‘EmployAbility - Let’s Work Together’ scheme which changes young disabled peoples’ lives for the better. It is founded on relationships with local schools, Dorothy Goodman in Leicestershire and Oakwood, Woodlands and Exhall Grange in Warwickshire. It is an employee-led supported internship scheme for young people aged 17 to 19. Since the scheme began in 2014 an average of 71% of interns gained paid employment either with them or with other local companies, compared to the national average of 6%. The company was recently awarded ‘Most Supportive Employer’ by the National Autistic Society.

In 2017/18  Cadent Gas Limited replaced and improved  of mains pipe.

In 2018, Cadent Gas Limited were awarded for being the top UK company for apprentices to work and amongst the top 20 companies for graduates.

History 
1986: Transfer of assets of British Gas Corporation to British Gas plc (integrated gas company for UK), with trading of shares in British Gas plc commencing in December
1997: Demerger of Centrica from British Gas
2000: Demerger of Lattice from British Gas
2002: Merger of National Grid and Lattice  Transco.
2005: Sale of four gas distribution networks, and adoption of National Grid as the single name for principal businesses
2016: Creation of National Grid Gas Distribution Ltd as part of National Grid
2017: Sale of a majority stake of National Grid Gas Distribution in March, with operations beginning under the Cadent brand from May
2019: Sale of National Grid's remaining stake in Cadent
2022: A major outage took place on the Cadent Gas network in Stannington, Sheffield, affecting thousands of properties for more than a week amid below-freezing temperatures; Sheffield City Council declared a major incident. The outage was caused by a burst water main flooding the complex local gas main network.

References

External links 

 

Energy companies of the United Kingdom